Paulo Sérgio Bento Brito (born 19 February 1968), known as Paulo Sérgio, is a Portuguese retired footballer who played as a forward, currently manager of Portimonense.

He amassed Primeira Liga totals of 86 matches and 18 goals over seven seasons, but played mainly in the lower divisions of Portugal.

Paulo Sérgio began his career as manager in 2003 and went on to be in charge of several teams, including Vitória Guimarães, Sporting CP, and Hearts in Scotland.

Playing career
Born in Estremoz, Alentejo Region, Paulo Sérgio's football career was spent mainly as a substitute, at least in the Primeira Liga. In 17 professional seasons, he represented C.D. Olivais e Moscavide, U.D. Vilafranquense, C.F. Os Belenenses – his most steady period, helping the Lisbon side finish in second position in the Segunda Liga in 1991–92 with a career-best eight goals, with the consequent promotion – F.C. Paços de Ferreira (his best year in the top division came whilst at this club, scoring five times in 26 games in the 1993–94 campaign, even though 14 of those came from the bench, as they were eventually relegated), S.C. Salgueiros, Vitória de Setúbal, C.D. Feirense, C.D. Santa Clara, G.D. Estoril Praia and S.C. Olhanense.

In 1998–99, Paulo Sérgio had a spell abroad with French team Grenoble Foot 38, in the Championnat de France Amateur.

Coaching career

Portugal
Paulo Sérgio took up coaching after retiring in 2003, his first experience being with his last club Olhanense, for three seasons. He next managed another former team, Azores's Santa Clara.

Paulo Sérgio's first spell in the top flight occurred in 2008–09, with yet another side he had represented as a footballer, Paços de Ferreira. However, on 14 October 2009, he left for Vitória S.C. to take the place of the sacked Nelo Vingada, signing until summer 2011.

In late April 2010, Paulo Sérgio reached an agreement to succeed Carlos Carvalhal at the helm of Sporting CP, effective as of July. After dispatching FC Nordsjælland of Denmark in the UEFA Europa League, he made his league debut on 14 August, suffering a 1–0 defeat at Paços.

On 26 February 2011, following a 0–2 home loss against S.L. Benfica in the league, and Europa League elimination at the hands of Rangers, with Sporting also out of domestic cup contention and trailing FC Porto by 23 points in the league, Paulo Sérgio's contract was mutually terminated.

Heart of Midlothian
Paulo Sérgio was appointed manager of Scottish Premier League club Heart of Midlothian on 2 August 2011, following the removal of his predecessor Jim Jefferies on the previous day. In October, the team withdrew their staff from all media events in protest at him being called in front of the Scottish Football Association following his remarks about referee Iain Brines after a defeat against Ayr United the following month. He was also sent to the stands for dissent during a game against Kilmarnock after Ian Black was sent off and Marius Žaliūkas fouled Paul Heffernan, allowing Dean Shiels to score the game's only goal from the penalty spot.

On 19 May 2012, Paulo Sérgio and Hearts won the Scottish Cup – the eighth overall for the club and the first in six years – after a 5–1 win over fellow Edinburgh side Hibernian. He rejected a new contract offer, and left on 7 June.

CFR Cluj
On 28 October 2012, Paulo Sérgio was appointed at CFR Cluj in Romania, after the Liga I team failed to reach an agreement with compatriot Sérgio Conceição.

He managed to lead the side to the Europa League knockout phase, but the year 2013 started badly with seven consecutive games without a win; thus, he was sacked on 13 April.

APOEL
On 20 May 2013, Paulo Sérgio signed a one-year contract with reigning Cypriot champions APOEL FC. He made his debut against NK Maribor at GSP Stadium on 31 July in a 1–1 first leg draw in the third qualifying round of the 2013–14 UEFA Champions League, with the tie being lost on the away goals rule. On 17 August he won his first trophy with his new club, after a 1–0 victory over Apollon Limassol in the Super Cup.

On 4 October 2013, APOEL parted company with Paulo Sérgio, who spent less than five months in charge of the team and managed just three wins in 11 matches.

Académica
On 31 May 2014, Paulo Sérgio signed a one-year deal with Académica de Coimbra. His first official game in charge occurred on 16 August, a 1–1 home draw with Sporting.

Club and Paulo Sérgio agreed to part ways on 15 February 2015, with the team second from bottom having won once in 21 games.

Middle East
In June 2016, Paulo Sérgio was hired at Dibba Al-Fujairah Club. He was dismissed on 10 December, after taking five points with no wins in the first 11 UAE Pro-League matches of the season and immediately following an 8–0 loss to Al-Wasl FC.

Remaining in the Middle East, Paulo Sérgio signed a one-year deal with Sanat Naft Abadan F.C. in June 2018. He took the team to eighth in the Iran Pro League, and at the end of the campaign was hired by Al Taawoun FC in Saudi Arabia; he blamed U.S. sanctions against Iran for making his previous job difficult.

Paulo Sérgio left the club shortly before the end of 2019, with the team in sixth place – the holders had also been eliminated from the last 16 of the Kings Cup by Abha Club.

Portimonense
In February 2020, Paulo Sérgio became the second manager of second-from-bottom Portimonense S.C. in the Portuguese top-tier campaign. Though he improved their performance, earning himself the Manager of the Month award for June, the Algarve team were relegated on the final day; he voted to stay with them even before they were restored to the league as a result of Vitória de Setúbal's irregularities.

After finishing in 14th and 13th place, Paulo Sérgio signed a new contract in May 2022, tying him to Portimonense until 2024 in the aim of qualifying for European competition.

Managerial statistics

Honours

Player
Belenenses
Taça de Portugal: 1988–89

Santa Clara
Segunda Divisão: 1997–98 (South)

Grenoble
Championnat de France Amateur: 1998–99 (Group B)

Manager
Olhanense
Segunda Divisão: 2003–04 (South)

Heart of Midlothian
Scottish Cup: 2011–12

APOEL
Cypriot Super Cup: 2013

References

External links

1968 births
Living people
People from Estremoz
Sportspeople from Évora District
Portuguese footballers
Association football forwards
Primeira Liga players
Liga Portugal 2 players
Segunda Divisão players
C.D. Olivais e Moscavide players
U.D. Vilafranquense players
C.F. Os Belenenses players
F.C. Paços de Ferreira players
S.C. Salgueiros players
Vitória F.C. players
C.D. Feirense players
C.D. Santa Clara players
G.D. Estoril Praia players
S.C. Olhanense players
Championnat National 2 players
Grenoble Foot 38 players
Portuguese expatriate footballers
Expatriate footballers in France
Portuguese expatriate sportspeople in France
Portuguese football managers
Primeira Liga managers
Liga Portugal 2 managers
S.C. Olhanense managers
C.D. Santa Clara managers
S.C. Beira-Mar managers
F.C. Paços de Ferreira managers
Vitória S.C. managers
Sporting CP managers
Associação Académica de Coimbra – O.A.F. managers
Portimonense S.C. managers
Scottish Premier League managers
Heart of Midlothian F.C. managers
Liga I managers
CFR Cluj managers
Cypriot First Division managers
APOEL FC managers
UAE Pro League managers
Dibba Club managers
Persian Gulf Pro League managers
Sanat Naft Abadan F.C. managers
Saudi Professional League managers
Al-Taawoun FC managers
Portuguese expatriate football managers
Expatriate football managers in Scotland
Expatriate football managers in Romania
Expatriate football managers in Cyprus
Expatriate football managers in the United Arab Emirates
Expatriate football managers in Iran
Expatriate football managers in Saudi Arabia
Portuguese expatriate sportspeople in Scotland
Portuguese expatriate sportspeople in Romania
Portuguese expatriate sportspeople in Cyprus
Portuguese expatriate sportspeople in the United Arab Emirates
Portuguese expatriate sportspeople in Iran
Portuguese expatriate sportspeople in Saudi Arabia